Interstate 275 (I-275) may refer to:
Interstate 275 (Florida), a loop through Tampa, St. Petersburg, and Bradenton in Florida
Interstate 275 (Michigan), a western bypass of Detroit, Michigan
Interstate 275 (Ohio–Indiana–Kentucky), a full beltway around Cincinnati, Ohio
Interstate 275 (Tennessee), a connection to downtown Knoxville, Tennessee, from the north

75-2
2